Thomas Johnson "John" Reaves (March 2, 1950 – August 1, 2017) was an American college and professional football player who was a quarterback for 11 seasons in the National Football League (NFL) and three seasons in the United States Football League (USFL) during the 1970s and 1980s.  Reaves played college football for the University of Florida, and earned All-American honors.  

He was a first-round pick in the 1972 NFL Draft, and played professionally for the Philadelphia Eagles, Cincinnati Bengals, Minnesota Vikings, Houston Oilers, and Tampa Bay Buccaneers of the NFL, and the Tampa Bay Bandits of the USFL.

Early life 
Reaves was born in Anniston, Alabama, in 1950, and moved to Tampa, Florida, with his mother and grandmother after his father died when he was 9 years old.  He attended T.R. Robinson High School in Tampa, where he was a star high-school football quarterback for the Robinson Knights.  As a senior in 1967, he led the Knights to the Florida Class 2A football semifinal game before losing to the Coral Gables Cavaliers, who won the state championship and were ranked as the national champions afterward.  Reaves was lauded as the State Player of the Year.  He also played basketball and baseball and ran track for the Knights, and once scored 52 points in a high-school basketball game.

In 2007, 39 years after he graduated from high school, the Florida High School Athletic Association recognized Reaves as one of the "100 Greatest Players of the First 100 Years" of Florida high school football.

College career 

After graduating from high school, Reaves accepted an athletic scholarship to attend the University of Florida in Gainesville, Florida, and played quarterback for coach Ray Graves and coach Doug Dickey's Florida Gators football teams from 1969 to 1971.  In his first season as the Gators' starting quarterback, Reaves was part of a group of second-year star players known as the "Super Sophs", which included Reaves, wide receiver Carlos Alvarez, and running back Tommy Durrance.  Reaves and the Super Sophs led the Gators to their all-time best season record of 9–1–1, and an upset 14–13 victory over the Tennessee Volunteers in the 1969 Gator Bowl.  Reaves and Alvarez subsequently broke every Florida passing and receiving record during their three-year college careers, and Reaves set the National Collegiate Athletic Association (NCAA) career passing record of 7,581 yards and the Southeastern Conference (SEC) career record of 56 touchdowns.  Reaves was a first-team All-SEC selection in 1969, a first-team All-American in 1971, and a team captain in 1971.  As a senior, he received the Sammy Baugh Trophy, recognizing the nation's best college passer, and the Gators' Fergie Ferguson Award, recognizing the "senior football player who displays outstanding leadership, character, and courage."

His record as the NCAA's all-time career leader in passing yards was achieved after a controversial fourth-quarter play in the last game of the 1971 regular season against Miami. Most members of the Gators' defense lay down on the field in the fourth quarter, allowing the Miami Hurricanes to score a touchdown to allow Florida's offense to get the ball back so Reaves could set the record.  The event is referred to as the "Florida flop", and it is often recalled bitterly by Hurricanes alumni and fans.

Reaves returned to Gainesville during the NFL offseason and completed a bachelor's degree in business administration in 1973. He was later inducted into the University of Florida Athletic Hall of Fame as a "Gator Great" in 1985.  He was picked as number 30 among the 100 greatest Gators from the first century of the Florida football program by The Gainesville Sun in 2006.

Statistics 

1969: 222 completions on 396 attempts, 2,896 yards, 24 touchdowns, 19 interceptions
1970: 188 completions on 376 attempts, 2,549 yards, 13 touchdowns, 19 interceptions
1971: 193 completions on 356 attempts, 2,104 yards, 17 touchdowns, 21 interceptions

Professional career 

Reaves jumped to the expansion Tampa Bay Bandits of the start-up USFL in 1983; he was the Bandits' starting quarterback for three seasons under head coach Steve Spurrier in a pass-oriented offense.  He only played eight games of the 1983 season because of a wrist injury. However, he still managed to complete 139 passes out of 259 attempts.  He threw for 1,276 yards, but tossed 16 interceptions compared to nine touchdown passes.  He bounced back in 1984, going 313 out of 544 for 4,092 yards and tossing 28 touchdowns, compared to 16 interceptions.  This was the only USFL season in which he threw more touchdowns than interceptions.  In the league's final season, 1985, he was 314 for 561, throwing 29 interceptions compared to 25 touchdown passes.

Reaves was to play for the Orlando Renegades during the USFL's 1986 fall season, but the league dissolved before they could play a game. Reaves next appeared as a replacement player for the Tampa Bay Buccaneers during the  strike. Reaves's NFL career was that of a journeyman back-up—and his NFL career total of 3,417 yards showed it.  In Reaves's two seasons as the Bandits' full-time starting quarterback, however, he threw for over 4,000 yards passing both years (1984 and 1985), and just over 10,000 total yards in his three-season USFL career (1983–85).

Life after the NFL 

Reaves was an assistant football coach for the Florida Gators under head coach Steve Spurrier from 1990 to 1994, working primarily with the Gators quarterbacks, including Shane Matthews.  He left Gainesville to become an assistant coach for the South Carolina Gamecocks under head coach Brad Scott from 1995 to 1997.

Reaves was arrested on gun and drug-possession charges in 2008.  Reaves entered an Atlanta-area substance-abuse rehabilitation program in May 2009.

Football family 

Reaves was the former father-in-law of current Ole Miss Rebels football head coach Lane Kiffin, who was married to Reaves's daughter Layla.  Reaves's son David was an assistant coach under Kiffin during Kiffin's one year as the Tennessee Volunteers football head coach.  Reaves's younger son Stephen was a back-up quarterback for the Toronto Argonauts of the Canadian Football League (CFL).

See also 

 1971 College Football All-America Team
 Florida Gators football, 1960–69
 Florida Gators football, 1970–79
 List of Florida Gators football All-Americans
 List of Florida Gators in the NFL Draft
 List of Philadelphia Eagles first-round draft picks
 List of Philadelphia Eagles players
 List of United States Football League players
 List of University of Florida alumni
 List of University of Florida Athletic Hall of Fame members

References

Bibliography 

 Carlson, Norm, University of Florida Football Vault: The History of the Florida Gators, Whitman Publishing, LLC, Atlanta, Georgia (2007).  .
 Golenbock, Peter, Go Gators!  An Oral History of Florida's Pursuit of Gridiron Glory, Legends Publishing, LLC, St. Petersburg, Florida (2002).  .
 Hairston, Jack, Tales from the Gator Swamp: A Collection of the Greatest Gator Stories Ever Told, Sports Publishing, LLC, Champaign, Illinois (2002).  .
 McCarthy, Kevin M., Fightin' Gators: A History of University of Florida Football, Arcadia Publishing, Mount Pleasant, South Carolina (2000).  .
 McEwen, Tom, The Gators: A Story of Florida Football, The Strode Publishers, Huntsville, Alabama (1974).  .
 Nash, Noel, ed., The Gainesville Sun Presents The Greatest Moments in Florida Gators Football, Sports Publishing, Inc., Champaign, Illinois (1998).  .

External links
  Obituary of John Reaves
 Image of Reaves

1950 births
2017 deaths
All-American college football players
American football quarterbacks
Cincinnati Bengals players
Florida Gators football coaches
Florida Gators football players
Houston Oilers players
Sportspeople from Anniston, Alabama
Philadelphia Eagles players
South Carolina Gamecocks football coaches
Players of American football from Tampa, Florida
Tampa Bay Bandits players
Tampa Bay Buccaneers players
National Football League replacement players